Sungai Durian (Durian River) may refer to:

Sungai Durian, Kotabaru, a district of Kotabaru Regency, South Kalimantan, Indonesia
Sungai Durian, Patamuan, a village in the district of Patamuan, Padang Pariaman Regency, West Sumatra, Indonesia
Sungai Durian, Payakumbuh, a village in the district of Lamposi Tigo Nagari, Payakumbuh, West Sumatra, Indonesia
Sungai Durian, Perak, a village in the Hilir Perak District, Perak, Malaysia
Sungai Durian, Solok, a village in the district of IX Koto Sungai Lasi, Solok Regency, West Sumatra, Indonesia
Sungai Durian, Tabalong, a village in the district of Banua Lawas, Tabalong Regency, South Kalimantan, Indonesia